Grivel may refer to:
 Grivel (company), an Italian manufacturer of climbing equipment
 Grivel (car), a French car produced in 1897
 Grivel (surname), a French surname